The discography of The Mr. T Experience, a Berkeley, California-based punk rock band formed in 1985, consists of ten studio albums, five EPs, and nine singles. 

The Mr. T Experience formed in 1985 with an initial lineup of singer/guitarists "Dr. Frank" Portman and Jon Von Zelowitz, bassist Byron Stamatatos, and drummer Alex Laipeneiks. Their debut album Everybody's Entitled to Their Own Opinion was released in 1986 on local label Disorder Records. Night Shift at the Thrill Factory followed in 1988 through Rough Trade Records, who also released their EP Big Black Bugs Bleed Blue Blood in 1989. Stamatatos left the band and was replaced by Aaron Rubin, and when Rough Trade went out of business the band moved to Lookout! Records, where they would remain for the rest of their career. They released Making Things with Light in 1990, and both the Milk Milk Lemonade album and Strum ünd Bang, Live!? EP in 1992. Zelowitz left the band, leading to a brief breakup, but Portman, Rubin, and Laipeneiks decided to carry on as a trio and released the Gun Crazy EP and Our Bodies Our Selves album in 1993. Laipeneiks then left the band, leading to another breakup, but they reformed with new drummer Jim "Jym" Pittman for the EP ...And the Women Who Love Them in 1994. Rubin then left the group and was replaced by Joel Reader.

The lineup of Portman, Pittman, and Reader remained stable and released an album each year over a four-year period: Love is Dead (1996), Revenge is Sweet, and So Are You (1997), a cover version of the Ramones' Road to Ruin (1998), and Alcatraz (1999). Lookout! also released an expanded version of Big Black Bugs Bleed Blue Blood in 1997 with 24 additional tracks culled from the band's EPs, singles, and various compilation albums. Reader then left the band and Portman released a solo album. With new bassist Gabe Meline The Mr. T Experience released the EP The Miracle of Shame in 2000, which also included temporary Hammond organ player Erik Noyes. Meline left the band in 2002 and was replaced by "Bobby J" Jordan, while Ted Angel also joined as second guitarist. A "Special Addition" version of ...And the Women Who Love Them was released in 2002. Similar to the re-release of Big Black Bugs Bleed Blue Blood, this version included 18 additional tracks. The new four-piece Mr. T Experience lineup released Yesterday Rules in 2004.

Studio albums 

I Everybody's Entitled to Their Own Opinion was reissued on CD by Lookout! Records in 1990 and 1995.

II Night Shift at the Thrill Factory was re-released by Lookout! on CD in 1995 with 5 additional tracks.

III Road to Ruin is a cover version of the Ramones' 1978 album.

Extended plays 

I Big Black Bugs Bleed Blue Blood was reissued on CD by Lookout! Records in 1997 with 24 additional tracks.

II Strum ünd Bang, Live!? is out of print, however all of its tracks were included on the CD reissue of Big Black Bugs Bleed Blue Blood.

III A "Special Addition" of ...And the Women Who Love Them was released in 2002 with 18 additional tracks.

Singles

I Denotes tracks that were re-released on the CD version of Big Black Bugs Bleed Blue Blood.

II The split single with Sicko was re-released in 1998.

III Denotes tracks that were re-released on the "Special Addition" of ...And the Women Who Love Them.

IV "...And I Will Be with You" is a single from the album Revenge is Sweet, and So Are You (1997).

Reissues 

I Everybody's Entitled to Their Own Opinion was reissued by Lookout! a second time in 1995.

Other appearances 
The following Mr. T Experience songs were released on compilation albums, soundtracks, and other releases. Some songs were later re-released on the CD version of Big Black Bugs Bleed Blue Blood, the "Special Addition" version of ...And the Women Who Love Them, and other releases, as noted below. This is not an exhaustive list: songs that were first released on the band's albums, EPs, or singles are not included.

I "Boredom Zone" was reissued on the CD re-release of Night Shift at the Thrill Factory.

II Denotes tracks that were reissued on the CD re-release of Big Black Bugs Bleed Blue Blood.

III Denotes tracks that were reissued on the "Special Addition" version of ...And the Women Who Love Them.

References

External links 

 The Mr. T Experience on Myspace
 

Discography
Punk rock group discographies
Discographies of American artists